DYML (105.7 FM), broadcasting as 105.7 Love Radio, is a radio station owned and operated by Manila Broadcasting Company. 
The station's studio and transmitter are located at the 3rd Flr of Ricleah building San Miguel Village, Hemingway St. Brgy. Tiza, Roxas, Capiz.

History

2000-2014: Radyo Natin
The station was inaugurated on January 1, 2000, as a community radio station under the Radyo Natin Network. Its studio and transmitter were located near Bagong Lipunan Trade Center. It went off the air sometime 2004.

2015-present: Love Radio
In February 2015, the station returned on air, this time as 105.7 Love Radio and became the city's only 24-hour radio station since DYRX decreased its operating hours to 18 hours a day in the mid-nineties.

In August 2015, after 8 months of regular broadcast, Love Radio emerged as the new No. 1 music station in the city per Kantar Media radio survey.

References

External links
 105.7 Love Radio Roxas Facebook

Radio stations in Capiz
Love Radio Network stations
Radio stations established in 2000